Emma Saïd Ben Mohamed (10 December 1876 – 18 July 1930) was a French singer and circus performer. She was the maternal grandmother of Edith Piaf, France's national chanteuse. she worked as a singer and circus performer.

Early life
Emma was born on 10 December 1876 in her parents' car, which was stationed on the rue de la Paix in Soissons, France. Her father, Saïd Ben Mohamed, a Kabyle acrobat, was born in 1827 in Mogador. Her mother, Margherita (alternatively Marguerite; née Bracco), also an acrobat, was born in 1830 in Murazzano, Italy. Saïd and Margherita were married on 4 February 1853 in Poitiers. Two of Margherita's sisters, Anna and Maria Elisabetta, also married Moroccan circus performers.

Career
In 1894, Emma married fellow circus performer Auguste Eugène Maillard, whom she met whilst they were touring together with the circus. Her stage name at this time was "Aïcha". In 1895, their daughter, Annetta Giovanna was born in Livorno. Annetta went on to become a cabaret singer, under the stage name of Line Marsa. In 1915, Annetta gave birth to a daughter, who would later become the legendary French singer Édith Piaf.

Emma's husband, Eugène, died in 1912. Emma became the primary caregiver of her granddaughter, Édith, from 1915 to 1918. However Édith was a neglected child, and subsequently was sent to her paternal grandmother in Normandy. Emma remarried in 1923 to Adolphe Louis Cornu, a hairdresser. At the beginning of the 1920s, she lost her ability to sing, so she became a cleaner.

Death
A smoker and an alcoholic, Emma died in July 1930, aged 53, of tuberculosis.

In popular culture
Emma was portrayed by Farida Amrouche in Olivier Dahan's 2007 Piaf biopic, La vie en rose.

References

1876 births
1930 deaths
19th-century French women singers
20th-century French women singers
Édith Piaf
French people of Italian descent
French people of Kabyle descent
People from Soissons
20th-century deaths from tuberculosis
French circus performers
Tuberculosis deaths in France